Igor Yuryevich Marchenko (born 26 November 1975 in Rostov-on-Don, Rostov) is a Russian butterfly swimmer who competed at the 2000 and 2004 Olympics.

References

1975 births
Living people
Russian male swimmers
Olympic swimmers of Russia
Swimmers at the 2000 Summer Olympics
Swimmers at the 2004 Summer Olympics
World Aquatics Championships medalists in swimming
Medalists at the FINA World Swimming Championships (25 m)
European Aquatics Championships medalists in swimming
Universiade medalists in swimming
Universiade bronze medalists for Russia
Medalists at the 2001 Summer Universiade
Sportspeople from Rostov-on-Don